Dibektaş can refer to:

 Dibektaş, Ergani
 Dibektaş, Ulus
 Dibektaş, Yığılca